Deh Mir (also Romanized as Deh Mīr; also known as Deh-e Mīr) is a village in Bampur-e Gharbi Rural District, Central District, Bampur County, Sistan and Baluchestan Province, Iran. At the 2006 census, its population was 2,593, in 519 families.

References 

Populated places in Bampur County